The perisinusoidal space (or space of Disse) is a location in the liver between a hepatocyte and a sinusoid. It contains the blood plasma.  Microvilli of hepatocytes extend into this space, allowing proteins and other plasma components from the sinusoids to be absorbed by the hepatocytes. Fenestration and discontinuity of the endothelium facilitates this transport. This space may be obliterated in liver disease, leading to decreased uptake by hepatocytes of nutrients and wastes such as bilirubin.

The perisinusoidal space also contains hepatic stellate cells (also known as Ito cells), which store fat or fat soluble vitamins including  vitamin A).  A variety of insults that cause inflammation can result in the cells transforming into myofibroblasts, resulting in collagen production, fibrosis, and cirrhosis.

The Space of Disse was named after German anatomist Joseph Disse (1852–1912).

References

External links
 
  - "Ultrastructure of the Cell: hepatocytes and sinusoids, sinusoid and space of Disse"
  - "Liver, Gall Bladder, and Pancreas: liver; sinusoids and Kupffer cells"
  - "Mammal, liver (EM, Low)"

Liver anatomy
Histology